Safiabad may refer to:
 Safiabad, Bushehr, a village in Bushehr Province, Iran
 Safiabad, Chaharmahal and Bakhtiari, a village in Chaharmahal and Bakhtiari Province, Iran
 Safiabad, Fars, a village in Fars Province, Iran
 Safiabad, Golestan, a village in Golestan Province, Iran
 Safiabad, Kashan, a village in Isfahan Province, Iran
 Safiabad, Rafsanjan, a village in Kerman Province, Iran
 Safiabad, Shahr-e Babak, a village in Kerman Province, Iran
 Safiabad, Kermanshah, a village in Kermanshah Province, Iran
 Safiabad, Javanrud, a village in Kermanshah Province, Iran
 Safiabad, Khuzestan, a city in Khuzestan Province, Iran
 Safiabad Agricultural and Horticultural Centre, Khuzestan Province, Iran
 Safiabad, Kurdistan, a village in Kurdistan Province, Iran
 Safiabad, Qareh Chay, a village in Markazi Province, Iran
 Safiabad, Shahsavan Kandi, a village in Markazi Province, Iran
 Safiabad, alternate name of Seyfabad, Markazi
 Safiabad, North Khorasan, a city in North Khorasan Province, Iran
 Safiabad, Chenaran, a village in Chenaran County, Razavi Khorasan Province, Iran
 Safiabad, Joghatai, a village in Joghatai County, Razavi Khorasan Province, Iran
 Safiabad, Torqabeh and Shandiz, a village in Torqabeh and Shandiz County, Razavi Khorasan Province, Iran
 Safiabad, Zaveh, a village in Zaveh County, Razavi Khorasan Province, Iran
 Safiabad, Tehran, a village in Tehran Province, Iran
 Safiabad, Yazd, a village in Yazd Province, Iran
 Safiabad, Zanjan, a village in Zanjan Province, Iran
 Safiabad Rural District, in North Khorasan Province, Iran

See also 
 Safi Abad, a palace in Behshahr, Mazandaran, Iran
 Shafiabad (disambiguation)